Mary Lena Faulk (April 15, 1926 – August 3, 1995) was an American professional golfer.

Faulk was born in Chipley, Florida. At the age of 14 she moved to Thomasville, Georgia, where she won three consecutive Georgia Women's Amateur Matchplay Championships from 1946 to 1948.

In 1953, Faulk won the U.S. Women's Amateur. In 1954 she lost in the semi-finals to Mickey Wright. That year she was a member of the U.S. team that defeated Great Britain to win the Curtis Cup and in Georgia, she won the state's 1954 Medal Play Championship.

Faulk turned professional in 1955 and in her rookie year on the LPGA Tour finished second at the U.S. Women's Open. She retired from the pro tour in 1965 having won 10 tournaments including the Women's Western Open which was then one of the women's major golf championships. She taught golf for many years at clubs in Georgia and Colorado Springs, Colorado. For some time she operated a women's apparel store in Southern Pines, North Carolina with fellow golfer Peggy Kirk Bell.

In 1993, Faulk was inducted into the Georgia Golf Hall of Fame. She was living in Delray Beach, Florida, when she died in 1995.

Professional wins (13)

LPGA Tour wins (10)
1956 (1) Kansas City Open
1957 (1) St. Petersburg Open
1958 (1) Macktown Open
1961 (4) Babe Zaharias Open, Women's Western Open, Triangle Round Robin, Eastern Open
1962 (2) Peach Blossom Open, Visalia Open
1964 (1) St. Petersburg Women's Open Invitational

Other wins (3)
1951 Hardscrabble Open
1955 Virginia Hot Springs 4-Ball (with Betty Jameson)
1958 Homestead 4-Ball (with Betty Jameson)

Major championships

Wins (1)

Team appearances
Amateur
Curtis Cup (representing the United States): 1954 (winners)

See also
List of golfers with most LPGA Tour wins

References

American female golfers
LPGA Tour golfers
Winners of LPGA major golf championships
Winners of ladies' major amateur golf championships
Golfers from Florida
Golfers from Georgia (U.S. state)
People from Chipley, Florida
Sportspeople from Delray Beach, Florida
People from Thomasville, Georgia
1926 births
1995 deaths
20th-century American women